Secret Santa is a Western Christmas or Saint Nicholas tradition in which members of a group or community are randomly assigned a person to whom they give a gift.  The identity of the gift giver is to remain a secret and should not be revealed.

Deriving from the Christian tradition, the ritual is known as Secret Santa in the United States and the United Kingdom; as Kris Kringel or Kris Kindle (Christkindl) in Ireland; as Wichteln, Secret Santa, Kris Kringle, Chris Kindle (Christkindl) or Engerl-Bengerl in parts of Austria; as Secret Santa or Kris Kringle in Canada and Australia; as Secret Santa, Kris Kringle, or Monito-Monita in the Philippines; as Angelito in the Dominican Republic; and as Wichteln or Julklapp in Germany. Wichteln is what a Wichtel, a wight, does, a good deed. In Poland, Belgium and the Netherlands, the tradition is not associated with Christmas but with the feast of Saint Nicholas, on the eve of December 5 in Poland (Mikołajki) and the Netherlands and on December 6 in Belgium. In Ukraine it takes place on 19 December (Mykolay). All of these names derive from traditional gift-bringers: the American custom is named after Santa Claus, or St Nicholas (Poland and Ukraine), while Chris Kindle and Kris Kringle are both corruptions of the original name of the Austrian gift-bringer Christkindl, which means the "Christ Child". Exceptions are the UK (where the traditional gift-bringer is Father Christmas) and the Philippines (which has the Three Kings). Spain, Portugal and most places in Latin America use amigo secreto ("secret friend"), amigo invisible/invisível ("invisible friend"), and also amigo oculto ("hidden friend") in parts of Brazil. In Israel, this game is called  ("a dwarf and a giant") and is mostly played during Purim.

Related games

Thieving Secret Santa/Stealing Secret Santa/White Elephant/Yankee Swap/Grab Bag

In this completely different game, participants (players) bring one gift each which is potentially suitable or interesting to any of the other participants. The gifts should be wrapped in such a way as to disguise their nature. Ideally, the provider of each gift should not be disclosed when setting up the game. Players take turns and can either open a new gift or steal a previously opened gift. This game is more commonly known as the white elephant gift exchange, or Yankee Swap.

Guessing
In this version, each participant brings a gift for their assigned person, with a letter. This letter may or may not have hints on who the giver might be, depending on the rules participants have established. Each receiver must guess who made the gift.

Secret Casino Santa
In this version, each person buys a gift for specific amount, not for anyone specifically. Each person also puts in a specific amount of money into a pot. Who goes first in gift selection can be determined by random selection. The options are:

Option A: Choose a gift
Option B: Do not choose a gift, and go for Money.
Option C: Put your name in to win all the unwanted gifts by those who went for Option B.

At the end, the gifts that were chosen are opened and the winner of the money and leftover gifts are drawn.

Conspiracy Santa
In this version, participants engage in a "conspiracy" where all participants work together to select a gift for a single participant without that participant's direct involvement or knowledge. Many such individual "conspiracies" run concurrently, one for each participant. Email threads or web apps are commonly used to manage each "conspiracy" until a consensus is made, wherein the gift is purchased by a decided upon participant and given at a later date. A common theme of Conspiracy Santa is collectively learning about participants, making it popular for workplaces and schools.

Secret Santa online 
The tradition of Secret Santa is becoming increasingly popular in online communities.

There are several Secret Santa Generators that tell every participant in a group for whom to buy a gift. This is especially useful for groups who can't meet in person to draw the names from a hat or bowl before the Secret Santa event.

References

Christmas traditions
Giving
Articles containing video clips
Santa Claus